Elizabeth Lee Fierro (February 13, 1929 – April 5, 2020) was an American actress and theater promoter best known for playing Mrs. Kintner  in the Jaws film franchise.

Career
Fierro acted in a famous scene in the 1975 film Jaws, in which she (as Mrs. Kintner) slapped the police chief. The scene required several takes. 
Fierro recalled slapping the actor playing the police chief (Roy Scheider) 17 times, saying "I slapped him hard with a loose wrist, which was what I was taught in acting school."
Fierro reportedly had also "objected to the profanity" of the scene's dialogue as originally drafted, and the director, Steven Spielberg, wanted dialogue that accorded with Fierro's "everywoman looks," so the scene's dialogue was rewritten the day before it was filmed.

Fierro lived for many years on Martha's Vineyard, where from 1974 to 2017 she was artistic director of the Island Theatre Workshop and mentored hundreds of aspiring actors.
Kevin Ryan, the Theater's board president in 2020, who had worked with her for 30 years,  estimated that Fierro had mentored and taught theater to more than 1,000 children, and recalled Fierro as "fiercely dedicated to the mission of teaching. She, no matter what it was, would stay at it and get the job done."

In 2013, Fierro received a "Woman of the Year" award by Women Empowered to Make Healthy Choices for her local theater workshop.

Personal life and death
Fierro had training as an actress in theater but not as a screen actress.
In her personal life Fierro had five children.

In mid-2017, Fierro moved to Aurora, Ohio, to an assisted living facility, to be closer to her family. She died from COVID-19 on April 5, 2020.

Filmography

References

External links

1929 births
2020 deaths
American people of Italian descent
Deaths from the COVID-19 pandemic in Ohio
Actresses from Massachusetts
Place of birth missing
People from Martha's Vineyard, Massachusetts
Jaws (franchise)
20th-century American actresses
21st-century American actresses